John Herbert may refer to:

Politicians
John Herbert (c.1515-83 or later), MP for Much Wenlock 1553 and New Romney 1555
John Herbert (Secretary of State) (1550–1617), Welsh lawyer, diplomat and politician
John Herbert (died 1659) (1625–1659), English politician
John Carlyle Herbert (1775–1846), United States Representative from Maryland
John Herbert (Conservative politician) (1895–1943), British Conservative Member of Parliament and Governor of Bengal
John D. Herbert (1930–2017), Ohio Treasurer, 1963–1971
John Herbert, 8th Earl of Powis (born 1952), British peer
John Frederick Herbert (1868–1943), Australian politician
John Herbert (Queensland politician) (1925–1978), Australian Liberal politician

Sports
John Herbert (athlete) (born 1962), British athlete and bobsledder
Johnny Herbert (born 1964), English Formula 1 racer

Others
John Herbert (actor) (1929–2011), Brazilian actor and film producer
John Herbert (playwright) (1926–2001), author of Fortune and Men's Eyes
John Maurice Herbert, contemporary of Charles Darwin at Cambridge University
John Rogers Herbert (1810–1890), Victorian English painter
John Herbert, Family Guy character who is the town's notorious pervert